Sangley Point National High School (SPNHS) has total land area of 6100 sq.m., and is situated amongst residential units along La Naval Road inside the Naval Station Heracleo Alano in Sangley Point, San Antonio, Cavite City. Located at its back is the historic Cañacao Bay.

History
As a former annex of Cavite National High School, SPNHS was founded as Cavite National High School Sangley Annex. It was renamed Sangley Point National High School after being made an independent national high school by virtue of Republic Act 9113, which was enacted on September 10, 2001. The move of making it an independent national high school was spearheaded by the administrators of the school and the division at that time and the resolution authored by Cong. Plaridel Abaya. Presently, the school is catering to five hundred seventy two (572) high school students, dependent and non-military dependents. Most of its students reside inside the base and the barangays situated near NBC.

References

External links
 Cavite National High School - Graduates of CNHS 1988 Website
 2008 archive of Sangley Point National High School - SPNHS

High schools in Cavite
Schools in Cavite City